Emílio Da Silva (born 2 May 1988) is a Bissau-Guinean footballer who plays for Fátima in Portugal as a defender.

Career 
Da Silva started his career in Portugal with Atlético Reguengos  and soon had a stint with Spanish fifth tier club Las Norias. He made his professional debut with Atlético CP  in 2013. The following year he signed for Fátima.

Da Silva made his international debut against Botswana.

References

External links 
 

1988 births
Living people
Bissau-Guinean footballers
Association football defenders
Atlético S.C. players
Eléctrico F.C. players
GD Bragança players
C.D. Pinhalnovense players
Atlético Clube de Portugal players
C.D. Fátima players
Segunda Divisão players
Liga Portugal 2 players
Guinea-Bissau international footballers
Bissau-Guinean expatriate footballers
Bissau-Guinean expatriate sportspeople in Portugal
Expatriate footballers in Portugal